San Lorenzo in San Pietro is a Romanesque-style, Roman Catholic, parish church  in Montalcino, region of Tuscany, Italy. 

The church has a notable painting depicting the Glorification of the Eucharist by Ventura Salimbeni depicting God the Father and Jesus with wands on an astronomical depiction of the globe encompassing the universe.

References

Lorenzo in San Pietro
Lorenzo in San Pietro